Trailer Horn is a 1950 animated short film featuring Donald Duck and Chip 'n' Dale.  It was produced by Walt Disney Productions and released by RKO Radio Pictures, Inc.

Plot
Chip 'n' Dale wake up one morning and go out to collect nuts but then come upon Donald Duck (who is out having a nice relaxing vacation)'s footprints and claim he has stolen their nuts, commenting thievery isn't in the constitution and plan to give him a lesson. They follow the footprints to his trailer, where they find Donald sleeping (Chip opens Donald's eye to see sheep jumping over a fence and comments "Well what do you know?" then closes it) and begin to jump on the car horn, waking Donald. Angered, he captures Dale, but Chip bites his foot and he screams in pain as they run away. They imitate the scene and laugh hysterically.

Donald comes out of his trailer wearing a swim suit and notices a diving board. Chip and Dale decide to play a trick on him and mess with the diving board, causing Donald to land onto the board and later land in his trailer, inevitably making a mess. He figures out the trick, captures the chipmunks, puts them in the horn and rapidly honks it and puts them in a pie and tosses it into a tree. Donald laughs at them before he marches back into his trailer to eat breakfast.

Chip then looks up and notices pine cones on a branch and hatches a new plan. They run up the tree and see a hole in the trailer and Donald eating his breakfast. To the tune of Stop, Look, and Listen, the chipmunks drop pine cones on his breakfast and his head. Enraged, Donald hops into his car and starts ramming the tree with it until he makes it lean like a catapult. Before Donald can tear them apart, the chipmunks hop off the tree and, realizing he's doomed, Donald funereally bids farewell before his car is thrown into a cliff and destroyed. Chip and Dale watch from the sidelines as a dazed Donald comes out of the hood with the horn in his mouth and steering wheel in his hands, behaving like a car. He honks his horn repeatedly and "drives" away toward the horizon as the cartoon ends.

Voice cast
Clarence Nash as Donald Duck
Jimmy MacDonald as Chip
Dessie Flynn as Dale

Home media
The short was released on December 11, 2007 on Walt Disney Treasures: The Chronological Donald, Volume Three: 1947-1950.

References

External links
 
 

1950 short films
1950 animated films
1950s Disney animated short films
Donald Duck short films
Films produced by Walt Disney
1950s English-language films
American animated short films
RKO Pictures short films
RKO Pictures animated short films
Films about ducks
Films about rodents
Animated films about mammals
Films directed by Jack Hannah
1950s American films
Chip 'n' Dale films